Field hockey at the 2008 Summer Olympics in Beijing was held over a fourteen-day period beginning on 10 August, culminating with the medal finals on 22 and 23 August. All games were played at the hockey field constructed on the Olympic Green.

Competition format
Twelve teams competed in both the men's and women's Olympic hockey tournaments with the competition consisting of two rounds. In the first round, teams were divided into two pools of six teams, and play followed the round robin format with each of the teams playing all other teams in the pool once.  Teams were awarded three points for a win, one point for a draw and zero points for a loss. At the end of the pool matches, teams were ranked in their pool according to the following criteria, in order:
 Total points accumulated
 Number of matches won
 Goal difference
 Goals for
 The result of the match played between the teams in question

Following the completion of the pool games, teams placing first and second in each pool advanced to a single elimination round consisting of two semifinal games, and the bronze and gold medal games. Remaining teams competed in classification matches to determine their ranking in the tournament. During these matches, extra time of 7 minutes per half was played if teams were tied at the end of regulation time. During extra time, play followed golden goal rules, with the first team to score declared the winner. If no goals were scored during extra time, a penalty stroke competition took place.

Competition schedule
The competition schedule was released on 29 May 2008, by the International Hockey Federation and Beijing Organizing Committee for the Olympic Games.

Qualification

Men's qualification
Each of the continental champions from five federations and host received an automatic berth. The European and Asian federations received two and one extra quotas respectively, based upon the FIH World Rankings at the completion of the 2006 World Cup. In addition to the three teams qualifying through the Olympic Qualifying Tournaments, the following twelve teams, shown with final pre-tournament rankings, competed in this tournament.

Women's qualification
Each of the continental champions from five federations and host received an automatic berth. The European federation received two extra quotas, while Oceania received one extra quota, based upon the FIH World Rankings at the completion of the 2006 World Cup. In addition to the three teams qualifying through the Olympic Qualifying Tournaments, the following twelve teams, shown with final pre-tournament rankings, competed in this tournament.

 – China qualified both as host and continental champion; therefore, that quota was given to the Asian federation, allowing Japan to qualify directly for the 2008 Summer Olympics as the second-placed team at the 2006 Asian Games .

Men's tournament

First round

Pool A

Pool B

Medal round

Final ranking

Women's tournament

First round

Pool A

Pool B

Medal round

Final ranking

Medal summary

Medal table

Medalists

References

External links
Official FIH website
Hockey – Official Results Book

 
2008 Summer Olympics events
Field hockey at the Summer Olympics
2008
Summer Olympics